Sekikaic acid is an organic compound in the structural class of chemicals known as depsides. It is found in some lichens. First isolated from Ramalina sekika, it is a fairly common lichen product in the genera Ramalina and Cladonia. The species epithet of the powdery lichen Lepraria sekikaica refers to the presence of this substance—a rarity in genus Lepraria.

Properties
In its purified form, sekikaic acid exists as colourless rectangular prisms or rhombic plates. Its molecular formula is C22H2608. An ethanolic solution of sekikaic acid reacts with iron(III) chloride to produce a violet colour. Its ultraviolet spectrum has four peaks of maximum absorption (λmax) at 219, 263, and 303 nm.

Sekikaic acid has been demonstrated to have several biological activities in laboratory experiments. These include antioxidant activity, inhibition of the enzymes α-glucosidase and α-amylase, hypoglycemic activity, and lipid-lowering activity. It also has antiviral activity against Respiratory syncytial virus, even more so than the standard antiviral medication ribavirin.

Related compounds
The sekikaic acid chemosyndrome contains similar compounds that are metabolically related to sekiaic acid. It comprises sekikaic acid as the major compound, and 4O-demethylsekikaic and homosekikaic acids as satellite metabolites.

References

Polyphenols
Lichen products
Methoxy compounds